Peniocereus is a genus of vining cacti, comprising about 18 species, found from the southwestern United States and Mexico. They have a large underground tuber, thin and inconspicuous stems.
Its name comes from the prefix penio- (from the Latin penis, meaning ‘tail’) and Cereus, the large genus from which it was split.

Known as  the desert night-blooming cereus, it also shares its common names of "night-blooming cereus" and "queen of the night" with many other similar cacti.

Taxonomy
Peniocereus was first described in 1905 by Alwin Berger as a subgenus of Cereus with a single species, Cereus greggii. This taxon was elevated to the genus level as Peniocereus greggii by Britton and Rose in 1909. Later in 1974 an infrageneric classification was constructed based on morphological features that split Peniocereus into two subgenera: Peniocereus and Pseudoacanthocereus. In 2005 a molecular phylogenetic study of the genus supported this split and showed that Peniocereus is not monophyletic.

Species
Species include:

Subgenus Peniocereus
Molecular phylogeny supported the position of this subgenus within Echinocereeae.

Nyctocereus
The 2005 molecular study showed that P. serpentinus is in Echinocereeae along with subgenus Peniocereus, but suggests resurrecting the monotopic Nyctocereus as it is sister to Bergerocactus.

Subgenus Pseudoacanthocereus
Molecular phylogeny and morphological evidence suggests this subgenus is more closely related to Acanthocereus.

References

 
Cactoideae genera
Cacti of Mexico
Cacti of the United States
Flora of the Southwestern United States
Flora of the Sonoran Deserts
Night-blooming plants
Taxa named by Alwin Berger
Taxa named by Nathaniel Lord Britton
Taxa named by Joseph Nelson Rose